The following institutions use, or have used, the name of Armenian National Council:
Armenian National Council (1917–18), initially based in Tbilisi, which declared the independence of the First Republic of Armenia in 1918 
Armenian National Council of Karabakh, also referred to as People's Government of Karabakh before the rename in September 1918 to Karabakh Council
Armenian National Council of Baku